Elections to the United States House of Representatives in Florida were held November 5, 1878 for the 46th Congress.

Background
For the first few post-Reconstruction elections in Florida, the Republicans dominated Congressional elections.  The previous election was the first election in which a Democrat won on the initial results (a Republican victory was successfully contested by a Democrat after the 1870 and 1874 elections).  Going into the election, Florida's delegation was split between one Republican and one Democrat.

Election results

Contested election
As in the 1874 and 1876 elections, the results in the 2nd district were successfully contested.  This time, Horatio Bisbee, Jr. (R) successfully challenged the election of Noble A. Hull (D), and was declared with victor with a vote of 11,194 - 10,844, serving in House January 22 - March 3, 1881

See also
United States House of Representatives elections, 1878

References

1878
Florida
United States House of Representatives